Lääneotsa is a village in Viimsi Parish, Harju County in northern Estonia.

Gallery

References

 

Villages in Harju County